Maximiliano Carnelutto (born 14 December 1992) is an Argentine professional footballer who plays as a defender for Defensores Unidos.

Career
Carnelutto spent time in the youth ranks of Platense, Colegiales and Villa Dálmine. He played for Belgrano de Zárate between 2013 and 2015, making ten appearances in the 2013–14 Torneo Argentino B as they suffered relegation. He remained with them in Torneo Federal C. In 2016, Carnelutto joined Primera C Metropolitana side Defensores Unidos. Two goals in seventy-three fixtures arrived in two seasons, with 2017–18 concluding with promotion to Primera B Metropolitana; as he scored the clinching goal. His tier three debut came in a 1–0 loss to UAI Urquiza on 19 August 2018; thirty-six appearances followed.

In July 2019, Carnelutto was signed by Ferrocarril Midland of Primera C Metropolitana. He participated in sixteen matches for them, prior to the COVID-19 pandemic. October 2020 saw Carnelutto rejoin Defensores Unidos.

Personal life
Carnelutto is a graduate of the National Technological University, majoring in mechanical engineering in 2017.

Career statistics
.

Honours
Defensores Unidos
Primera C Metropolitana: 2017–18

References

External links

1992 births
Living people
Place of birth missing (living people)
Argentine footballers
Association football defenders
Torneo Argentino B players
Primera C Metropolitana players
Primera B Metropolitana players
Defensores Unidos footballers
Club Ferrocarril Midland players